Denis Murphy (14 December 1910 – 25 March 1989) was an Irish hurler. At club level he played for Thurles Sarsfields and was the full-forward on the Tipperary senior hurling team that won the 1937 All-Ireland Championship.

Murphy made his first appearance for the Tipperary senior hurling team during the 1936 Munster Championship, having earlier played for the Tipperary junior team. In 1937 he won an All-Ireland Championship medal when Tipperary defeated Kilkenny, having earlier won a Munster Championship medal.

Honours

Tipperary
All-Ireland Senior Hurling Championship (1): 1937
Munster Senior Hurling Championship (1): 1937

References

1910 births
1989 deaths
Thurles Sarsfields hurlers
Tipperary inter-county hurlers
All-Ireland Senior Hurling Championship winners